is a Japanese film and production studio company of Shochiku Group, which has been producing movies and dramas for roughly a century, being the second-oldest motion picture company in Japan.

The company has production bases in Kyoto and Tokyo since its inception in the 1920s, and the long-established  is equipped with a studio facility that is deeply rooted in tradition.

It has also worked on the production of Hollywood films such as "The Last Samurai".

Shochiku Studio is known for productions of many Japanese period dramas, movies, TV and commercials.

History

Studios and Owners 

Shochiku Studio based in Tokyo and Kanagawa 

Shochiku Studio based in Shimogamo, Kyoto

Shochiku Studio based in Uzumasa, Kyoto

1920s - 1930s 
Shochiku built  as its main studio at Kamata, Tokyo in 1920.

In 1923, Shochiku Kamata studio was heavily damaged by Great Kantō earthquake, forcing a temporary relocation to Kyoto, in which the predecessor of current Shochiku Kyoto Studio was established.

, the executive placed in charge of reconstruction at Kamata, was permitted to make films with the remaining staff. Together with young directors like Yasujirō Ozu, Heinosuke Gosho, Hiroshi Shimizu and Torajirō Saitō and Shintarō Kido produced Shomin-geki (films about ordinary folks, including company employees who were part of a rising urban middle class).

The studio's first talking film, Madam-to-Nyobo was produced in 1931.

1940s - 1980s 
Legendary film directors shot at Shochiku Ofuna Studio such as Nagisa Ōshima led Japanese Nouvelle Vague, a group of filmmakers under Japanese New Wave Film movement which was characterized in its anti-authority. Together with Masahiro Shinoda and Yoshishige Yoshida, who are also known as the filmmakers worked at Shochiku during the 1950s to 1960s, they were leading so-called .

, the predecessor of the company, was founded in 1946 and later on in 1952 became a subsidiary of Shochiku. Shochiku relocated its production base to Uzumasa and name of the studio in Uzumasa was changed to Shochiku Kyoto Studio.

In 1975, Shochiku transferred the Studio in Uzumasa to Kyoto Eiga while Kyoto Eiga closed the studio in Shimogamo and relocated its production base to Uzumasa.

1990s - Present 

In the same year Shochiku Ofuna Studio transformed into a theme park, but in 1998 it became inoperational, and its site was sold to Kamakura Women's University in 2000. Thereon, Shochiku has relied on its film studio and backlot in Kyoto.

The company, was founded in 2008 as the successor of Shochiku Kyoto Eiga and Kyoto Film Studio with the name changed to its the current studio name, i.e., Shochiku Kyoto Studio.

In 2011, The company's name was changed to its current name, i.e., Shochiku Studio.

See also

List of Japanese movie studios

References

External links
Official site

Japanese film studios
Mass media companies of Japan
Japanese brands

2008 establishments in Japan